Patricia Ann Tudor Sandahl, née Howard, also Rosén from previous marriage (born 19 July 1940 in Manchester, England) is a Swedish psychotherapist and author. She is a doctor in philosophy and pedagogics, and a philosophy licentiat in sociology, psychologist. Tudor Sandahl is a retreat-leader for the Stiftelsen Berget in Rättvik, Sweden.

In 1981, she married professor Christer Sandahl.

Bibliography
Om barnet inom oss. 1983. .
Det glömda självet. 1989. .
Det omöjliga yrket. 1990. .
Den fängslande verkligheten. 1992. .
Ett himla liv, självbiografi. 1996. .
Ordet är ditt. 1997. .
Den tredje åldern. 1999. .
Ett himla liv: En självbiografisk berättelse. 2002. Översättning: Gun Zetterström
Daisan no nenrei o ikiru. Koreika shakai, feminizumu no senshinkoku Suweden kara. Kurube Noriko, yaku. 2004. .
Das Leben ist ein langer Fluss. über das Älterwerden. Aus dem Schwed. von Sigrid Irimia. 2004. .
Kolmas ikä/suomennos. Oili Räsänen. 2006. .
Tid att vara ensam. 2002. .
Verabredung mit mir selbst. von der Kraft, die im Alleinsein liegt/aus dem Schwedischen von Sigrid Irimia. 2005. .
Eftertankar. 2003. .
En given väg. 2005. .
Finde zu dir selbst. vom Sinn im Leben und von der Weisheit des eigenen Wegs/aus dem Schwedischen von Sigrid Irimia. 2006. .
I tacksamhetens tecken. 2007. .
Tid för förändring. 2009. 
Den fjärde åldern. 2009. 
Din egen väg. 2013.

References

Swedish women writers
Swedish psychotherapists
1940 births
Living people
British emigrants to Sweden